CIMUN may refer to:

COMSATS International Model United Nations
Cairo International Model United Nations
Chicago International Model United Nations